The 1982 FIS Freestyle Skiing World Cup was the third World Cup season in freestyle skiing organised by International Ski Federation. The season started on 2 January 1982 and ended on 26 March 1982. This season included four disciplines: aerials, moguls, ballet and combined.

Men

Moguls

Ballet

Aerials

Combined

Ladies

Moguls

Ballet

Aerials

Combined

Men's standings

Overall 

Standings after 40 races.

Moguls 

Standings after 11 races.

Aerials 

Standings after 9 races.

Ballet 

Standings after 11 races.

Combined 

Standings after 9 races.

Ladies' standings

Overall 

Standings after 40 races.

Moguls 

Standings after 11 races.

Aerials 

Standings after 9 races.

Ballet 

Standings after 11 races.

Combined 

Standings after 9 races.

References

FIS Freestyle Skiing World Cup
World Cup